The 2017–18 Sydney Blue Sox season will be the team's seventh season. The Blue Sox will compete in the Australian Baseball League (ABL) with five other teams, playing its home games at Blacktown International Sportspark Sydney.

Offseason

Regular season

Standings

Record vs opponents

Game log 

|-
| 1
| 16 November
| 
| 
| 
| 
| 
| 
| 
|- 
| 2
| 17 November
| 
| 
|
|
| 
|
| 
|-
| 3
| 18 November
| 
|
|
|
| 
|
|
|-
| 4
| 19 November
| 
|
|
|
| 
|
| 
|- 
| 5
| 23 November
| @ 
| 
|
| 
| 
|
| 
|-
| 6
| 24 November
| @ 
|
| 
|
| 
|
|
|-
| 7
| 25 November
| @ 
|
| 
| 
| 
| 
| 
|-
| 8
| 26 November
| @ 
| 
| 
| 
| 
| 
| 
|-
| 9
| 30 November
| 
|
| 
| 
| 
| 
| 
|-

|-
| 10
| 1 December
|  
| 
| 
| 
| 
| 
| 
|-
| 11
| 2 December
|  
| 
| 
| 
| 
| 
| 
|- 
| 12
| 3 December
| 
|
|
| 
|
|
|
|- 
| 13
| 7 December
| @ 
|
|
| 
| 
| 
|
|- 
| 14
| 8 December
| @ 
|
|
| 
| 
| 
|
|- 
| 15
| 9 December
| @ 
| 
| 
| 
| 
| 
| 
|- 
| 16
| 10 December
| @ 
|
| 
| 
| 
|
| 
|- 
| 17
| 14 December
| @ 
| 
| 
| 
| 
| 
| 
|- 
| 18
| 15 December
| @ 
| 
| 
| 
| 
| 
|
|- 
| 19
| 16 December
| @ 
| 
| 
| 
| 
| 
|
|- 
| 20
| 17 December 
| @ 
| 
| 
|
| 
|
| 
|- 
| 21
| 28 December
| 
|
|
| 
| 
|
|
|- 
| 22
| 29 December
| 
| 
|
| 
| -
| 
| 
|- 
| 23
| 30 December
| 
|
| 
|
| 
| 
| 
|- 
| 24
| 31 December
| 
| 
| 
| 
| 
| 
| 
|-

|- 
| 25
| 4 January
| 
| 
| 
| 
| 
| 
| 
|- 
| 26
| 5 January
| 
| 
| 
| 
| 
| 
| 
|- 
| 27
| 6 January
| 
| 
|
| 
| 
| 
| 
|- 
| 28
| 7 January
| 
| 
| 
| 
| 
| 
| 
|- 
| 29
| 11 January
| @ 
| 
| 
|
| 
| 
| 
|- 
| 30
| 12 January
| @ 
|
| 
| 
| 
| 
|
|- 
| 31
| 13 January
| @ 
| 
|
| 
| 
| 
| 
|- 
| 32
| 14 January
| @ 
| 
| 
| 
| 
| 
| 
|- 
| 33
| 18 January
| 
| 
| 
| 
| 
| 
| 
|- 
| 34
| 19 January
| 
| 
| 
| 
| 
| 
| 
|-
| 35
| 20 January
| 
|
| 
| 
| 
| 
| 
|- 
| 36
| 21 January
| 
|
|
| 
| 
|
|
|-
| 37
| 25 January
| @ 
|
| 
|
| 
| 
| 
|- 
| 38
| 26 January
| @ 
|
| 
| 
|
|
| 
|- 
| 39
| 27 January
| @ 
|
|
| 
| 
|
| 
|-

Roster

References 

Sydney Blue Sox